Salvisa is a census-designated place in Mercer County, Kentucky, United States. Its population was 420 as of the 2010 census. Salvisa has a post office with ZIP code 40372, which opened on April 4, 1825.

Salvisa was laid out in 1816.

Demographics

Climate
The climate in this area is characterized by hot, humid summers and generally mild to cool winters.  According to the Köppen Climate Classification system, Salvisa has a humid subtropical climate, abbreviated "Cfa" on climate maps.

References

Census-designated places in Mercer County, Kentucky
Census-designated places in Kentucky